Ganesh Chaturthi, also known as Vinayak Chaturthi, or Ganeshotsav is a Hindu festival commemorating the birth of the Hindu god Ganesha. The festival is marked with the installation of Ganesha's clay idols privately in homes and publicly on elaborate pandals (temporary stages). Observances include chanting of Vedic hymns and Hindu texts, such as prayers and vrata (fasting). Offerings and prasada from the daily prayers, that are distributed from the pandal to the community, include sweets such as modaka as it is believed to be a favourite of Ganesha. The festival ends on the tenth day after start, when the idol is carried in a public procession with music and group chanting, then immersed in a nearby body of water such as a river or sea, called visarjan on the day of Anant Chaturdashi. In Mumbai alone, around 150,000 statues are immersed annually. Thereafter the clay idol dissolves and Ganesha is believed to return to his celestial abode. 

The festival celebrates Ganesha as the God of New Beginnings and the Remover of Obstacles as well as the god of wisdom and intelligence and is observed throughout India, especially in the states such as Tamil Nadu, Maharashtra, Karnataka, Kerala, Andhra Pradesh and Goa. Ganesh Chaturthi is also observed in Nepal and by the Hindu diaspora elsewhere such as in Australia, New Zealand, Canada, Singapore, Malaysia, Trinidad and Tobago, Guyana, Suriname, other parts of the Caribbean, Fiji, Mauritius, South Africa, the United States, and Europe. In the Gregorian calendar, Ganesh Chaturthi falls between 22 August and 20 September every year.

Although it was unknown when or where Ganesh Chaturthi was first observed, the public celebration was initiated by Bal Gangadhar Tilak in Pune in the year 1893. At public venues, along with the reading of texts and group feasting, athletic and martial arts competitions are also held.

History

Ganesha

Though not alluding to the classical form of Ganapati, the earliest mention of Ganapati is found in the Rigveda. It appears twice in the Rigveda, once in shloka 2.23.1, as well as in shloka 10.112.9. Both of these shlokas imply a role of Ganapati as "the seer among the seers, abounding beyond measure in food presiding among the elders and being the lord of an invocation", while the shloka in mandala 10 states that without Ganapati "nothing nearby or afar is performed without you", according to Michael. However, it is uncertain that the Vedic term Ganapati which literally means "guardian of the multitudes", referred specifically to later era Ganesh, nor do the Vedic texts mention Ganesh Chaturthi. appears in post-Vedic texts such as the Grhya Sutras and thereafter ancient Sanskrit texts such as the Vajasaneyi Samhita, the Yajnavalkya Smriti and the Mahabharata mention Ganapati as Ganesvaras and Vinayak. Ganesh appears in the medieval Puranas in the form of "god of success, obstacle remover". The Skanda Purana, Narada Purana and the Brahma Vaivarta Purana, in particular, profusely praise him.  Beyond textual interpretations, archaeological and epigraphical evidence suggest Ganesha had become popular, was revered before the 8th century CE and numerous images of him are traceable to the 7th century or earlier.

For example, carvings at Hindu, Buddhist, and Jain temples such as at the Ellora Caves, dated between the 5th and 8th-century show Ganesha reverentially seated with major Hindu goddess (Shakti).

Festival 

Although it is unknown when (or how) Ganesh Chaturthi was first observed, the festival has been publicly celebrated in Pune since the era of King Shivaji (1630–1680, founder of the Maratha Empire). The Peshwa in the 18th century were devotees of Ganesha and started as a public Ganesh festival in their capital city of Pune during the month of Bhadrapad. After the start of the British Raj, the Ganesh festival lost state patronage and became a private family celebration in Maharashtra until its revival by Indian freedom fighter and social reformer Lokmanya Tilak. Indian freedom fighter Lokmanya Tilak, championed it as a means to circumvent the colonial British government ban on Hindu gatherings through its anti-public assembly legislation in 1892. 

I followed with the greatest curiosity crowds who carried in procession an infinite number of idols of the God Ganesh. Each little quarter of the town, each family with its adherents, each little street corner I may almost say, organizes a procession of its own, and the poorest may be seen carrying on a simple plank their little idol or of paper mâché... A crowd, more or less numerous, accompanies the idol, clapping hands and raises cries of joy, while a little orchestra generally precedes the idol.
– Angelo de Gubernatis, Bombay Gazette (1886)

According to others such as Kaur, the festival became a public event later, in 1892 when Bhausaheb Laxman Javale (also known as Bhau Rangari), installed the first sarvajanik (public) Ganesha idol in Pune. In 1893, the Indian freedom fighter Lokmanya Tilak praised the celebration of Sarvajanik Ganesh Utsav in his newspaper, Kesari, and dedicated his efforts to launch the annual domestic festival into a large, well-organised public event. Tilak recognised Ganesh's appeal as "the god for everybody", and according to Robert Brown, he chose Ganesha as the god that bridged "the gap between Brahmins and non-Brahmins", thereby building a grassroots unity across them to oppose British colonial rule.

Other scholars state that the British Empire, after 1870 out of fear of seditious assemblies, had passed a series of ordinances that banned public assembly for social and political purposes of more than 20 people in British India, but exempted religious assembly for Friday mosque prayers under pressure from the Indian Muslim community. Tilak believed that this effectively blocked the public assembly of Hindus whose religion did not mandate daily prayers or weekly gatherings, and he leveraged this religious exemption to make Ganesh Chaturthi to circumvent the British colonial law on large public assembly. He was the first to install large public images of Ganesha in pavilions in Bombay Presidency, and other celebratory events at the festival.

According to Richard Cashman, Tilak recruited and passionately committed himself to god Ganesha after the 1893 Hindu-Muslim communal violence in Bombay and the Deccan riots, when he felt that the British India government under Lord Harris had repeatedly taken sides and not treated Hindus fairly because Hindus were not well organised. In Tilak's estimate, Ganesha worship and processions were already popular in rural and urban Hindu populations, across social castes and classes in Baroda, Gwalior, Pune and most of the Maratha region in the 18th century. In 1893, Tilak helped expand Ganesh Chaturthi festival into a mass community event and a hidden means for political activism, intellectual discourse, poetry recitals, plays, concerts, and folk dances.

In Goa, Ganesh Chaturthi predates the Kadamba era. The Goa Inquisition had banned Hindu festivals, and Hindus who did not convert to Christianity were severely restricted. However, Hindu Goans continued to practice their religion despite the restrictions. Many families worship Ganesha in the form of patri (leaves used for worshiping Ganesha or other gods), a picture is drawn on paper or small silver idols. In some households Ganesha idols are hidden, a feature unique to Ganesh Chaturthi in Goa due to a ban on clay Ganesha idols and festivals by the Jesuits as part of the Inquisition.

Celebration in India 

In India, Ganesh Chaturthi is primarily celebrated at home and in public by local community groups in the central and western states of Maharashtra, Madhya Pradesh, Gujarat, Rajasthan and Goa and the southern states of Karnataka, Andhra Pradesh, Telangana, Tamil Nadu  and eastern states of West Bengal and Odisha and in North eastern states of Assam. 

On the same day, Chaurchan festival is celebrated in Mithila region of Bihar which is related to Ganesha and the moon-god Chandra.

The date for the festival is usually decided by the presence of Chaturthi Thithi. The festival is held during "Bhadrapada Madyahanaa Purvabaddha". If the Chaturthi Thiti begins at night on the previous day and gets over by morning on next day, then the next day is observed as Vinayaka Chaturthi.
In the consecration ceremony, a priest performs a Prana Pratishtha to invite Ganesh like a guest. This is followed by the 16-step Shodashopachara ritual, (Sanskrit: Shodash, 16; Upachara, process) during which coconut, jaggery, modaks, durva grass and red hibiscus (Jaswand) flowers are offered to the idol. Depending on the region and time zone, the ceremony commences with hymns from the Rigveda, the Ganapati Atharvashirsa, the Upanishads and the Ganesh stotra (prayer) from the Narada Purana are chanted. In Maharashtra as well as Goa, Aartis are performed with friends and family, typically in the morning and evening.

In preparation for the festival, artisans create clay models of Ganesha for sale.

On the last day of the festival, the tradition of Ganesh visarjan or nimajjanam (lit. "immersion") takes places, when the Ganesha images are immersed in a river, sea or water body. On the last day, the devotees come out in processions carrying the idols of Ganesha, culminating in immersion. It is believed that the god who comes to the earthly realm on Ganesh Chaturthi, returns to his celestial abode after immersion. The celebration of Ganesh Chaturthi also denotes the significance of the cycle of birth, life and death. It is believed that when the idol of the Ganesha is taken out for immersion, it also takes away with it the various obstacles of the house and these obstacles are destroyed along with the immersion. Every year, people wait with great anticipation to celebrate the festival of Ganesh Chaturthi.

Domestic celebration

In Maharashtra, Ganesh Chaturthi is known as Ganeshotsav. Families install small clay statues for worship during the festival. At home, the festival preparation includes purchases such as puja items or accessories a few days in advance and booking the Ganesh murti as early as a month beforehand (from local artisans). The murti is brought home either a day before or on the day of the Ganesh Chaturthi itself. Families decorate a small, clean portion of the house with flowers and other colourful items before installing the idol. When the Murti is installed, it and its shrine are decorated with flowers and other materials. On the day of the festival, The ceremonial installation of the clay murti (idol) is done along with chants of holy mantras and pooja including bhajans during a certain auspicious period of the day. The Murti is worshipped in the morning and evening with offerings of flowers, durva (strands of young grass), karanji and modaks (jaggery and coconut flakes wrapped in rice flour dumplings). The worship ends with the singing of an aarti in honour of Ganesh, other Gods and Saints. 

In Maharashtra the Marathi aarti "Sukhakarta Dukhaharta", composed by the 17th-century saint, Samarth Ramdas is sung.
Family traditions differ about when to end the celebration. Domestic celebrations end after , 3, 5, 7 or 11 days. At that time the Murti is ceremoniously brought to a body of water (such as a lake, river or the sea) for immersion. In Maharashtra, Ganeshotsav also incorporates other festivals, namely Hartalika and the Gauri festival, the former is observed with a fast by women on the day before Ganesh Chaturthi whilst the latter by the installation of statues of Gauris. In some communities such as the Chitpavan, and the CKP, pebbles collected from river bank are installed as representations of Gauri.

In Goa, Ganesh Chaturthi is known as Chavath in Konkani and Parab or Parva ("auspicious celebration"); it begins on the third day of the lunar month of Bhadrapada. On this day Parvati and Shiva are worshipped by women, who fast. Instruments such as ghumots, Crash cymbals (ताळ(taal) in Konkani) and pakhavaj (an Indian barrel-shaped, two-headed drum)  are played during the rituals. The harvest festival, Navyachi Pancham, is celebrated the next day; freshly harvested paddy is brought home from the fields (or temples) and a puja is conducted. Communities who ordinarily eat seafood refrain from doing so during the festival.

In Karnataka the Gowri festival precedes Ganesh Chaturthi, and people across the state wish each other well. In Andhra Pradesh, Ganesh Murtis of clay (Matti Vinayakudu) and turmeric (Siddhi Vinayakudu) are usually worshipped at home with plaster of Paris Murti's.

Public celebration

Public celebrations of the festival are popular, and are organised by local youth groups, neighbourhood associations or groups of tradespeople. Funds for the public festival are collected from members of the association arranging the celebration, local residents and businesses. The Ganesh idols and accompanying statues are installed in temporary shelters, known as mandaps or pandals. Public preparations begin months in advance. The making of the Murti in Maharashtra usually begins with "Padya pooja" or worshipping the feet of Ganesh. The Murti's are brought to "pandals" on the day or a day before the festival begins. The pandals have elaborate decoration and lighting.

The festival features cultural activities such as singing, theatre and orchestral performances and community activities such as free medical checkups, blood-donation sites and donations to the poor. Ganesh Chaturthi, in addition to its religious aspects, is an important economic activity in Mumbai, Surat, Pune, Hyderabad, Bangalore, Chennai and Kurnool. Many artists, industries, and businesses earn a significant amount of their living from the festival, which is a stage for budding artists. Members of other religions also participate in the celebration.

In Tamil Nadu, the festival, also known as Vinayaka Chaturthi or Pillayar Chaturthi, falls on the fourth day after the new moon in the month of Āvaṇi in the Tamil calendar. The idols are usually made of clay or papier-mâché, since Plaster of Paris idols have been banned by the state government, but violations of this rule are often reported. Idols are also made of coconuts and other organic products. They are worshipped for several days in pandals, and immersed in the Bay of Bengal the following Sunday. In Kerala the festival is also known as Lamboodhara Piranalu, which falls in the month of Chingam. In Thiruvananthapuram a procession marches from the Pazhavangadi Ganapathi Temple to Shankumugham Beach, with tall statues of Ganesha made from organic items and milk immersed in the sea.

At prominent temples
At Varasidhi Vinayaka Swamy Temple in Kanipakam, Andhra Pradesh, annual brahmotsavams will be celebrated for 21 days starting from Vinayaka Chavithi day. The processional deity of Vinayaka (Ganesh) will be taken in a procession on different vahanams on these days amidst large number of pilgrims across the country.

Celebration outside India

In Pakistan, Ganesh Chaturthi celebrations are conducted by the Shri Maharashtra Panchayat, an organisation for Maharashtrians in Karachi.

Ganesh Chaturthi is celebrated in the UK by the British Hindu population living there. The Hindu Culture and Heritage Society, a Southall-based organisation, celebrated Ganesh Chaturthi for the first time in London in 2005 at the Vishwa Hindu Temple; and the idol was immersed in the River Thames at Putney Pier. Another celebration, organised by a Gujarati group, has been celebrated in Southend-on-Sea, and attracted an estimated 18,000 devotees. Annual celebrations are also held on the River Mersey in Liverpool.

The Philadelphia Ganesh Festival is one of the most popular celebrations of Ganesh Chaturthi in North America, and it is also celebrated in Canada (particularly in the Toronto area), Mauritius, Malaysia and Singapore. The Mauritius festival dates back to 1896, and the Mauritian government has made it a public holiday. In Malaysia and Singapore, the festival is more commonly known as Vinayagar Chaturthi because of the large Tamil-speaking Hindu minority.

In Ghana, ethnic African Hindus celebrate Ganesh Chaturti.

Foods 
 
The primary sweet dish during the festival is Modak (modak in Marathi and Konkani, modakam or kudumu in Telugu, modaka or kadubu in Kannada, kozhakatta or modakkam in Malayalam and kozhukattai or modagam in Tamil). A modak is a dumpling made from rice or wheat flour, stuffed with grated coconut, [jaggery], dried fruits and other condiments and steamed or fried. Another popular sweet dish is the karanji (karjikai in Kannada), similar to modak in composition and taste but in a semicircular shape. This sweet meal is called Nevri in Goa and is synonymous with Ganesh festival amongst the Goans and the Konkani diaspora.

In Andhra Pradesh and Telangana modak, laddu, vundrallu (steamed, coarsely ground rice-flour balls), panakam (a jaggery-, black pepper- and cardamom-flavoured drink), vadapappu (soaked moong lentils) and chalividi (a cooked rice flour and jaggery mixture) are offered to Ganesh. These offerings are known as naivedya, and a plate of modak traditionally holds 21 pieces of the sweet. In Goa, modak and a Goan version of idli (sanna) is popular.

Panchakajjaya is an offering made to Lord Ganesh during this festival in parts of Karnataka. It is a mixture of desiccated coconut, roasted Bengal gram powder, sugar, ghee, and sesame. Different versions of panchakajjaya are made. Roasted Bengal gram, green gram, roasted chana dal (putani) or aval can be used.

Environmental impact 
The Madras High Court ruled in 2004 that immersion of Ganesh idols is unlawful because it incorporates chemicals that pollute the sea water. In Goa the sale of plaster-of-Paris Ganesha idols has been banned by the state government and celebrants are encouraged to buy traditional, artisan-made clay idols. Recent initiatives to produce traditional clay Ganesh idols in Hyderabad have been sponsored by the Andhra Pradesh Pollution Control Board. Environmental concern is also making people in Gujarat to opt for Ganesh Idols made with a mixture of cow dung and clay. These are marketed as "Vedic Ganesh idols" by the organization making them.

Due to environmental concerns, a number of families now avoid bodies of water and let the clay statue disintegrate in a barrel of water at home. After a few days, the clay is spread in the garden. In some cities a public, eco-friendly process is used for the immersion.

Gallery

See also 

 Cultural depictions of elephants
 1994 plague in India

Notes

References

Bibliography
 
  Alternate Link

External links

Hindu festivals
Religious festivals in India
Ganesha
August observances
September observances
Festivals in Maharashtra
Festivals in Telangana
Articles containing video clips
Hindu festivals in India
Hindu festivals in Nepal
Hindu holy days